Mohd. Fakhruddin bin Mohd Ariff is a Malaysian politician  who has served as Member of the Pahang State Executive Council (EXCO) in the Barisan Nasional (BN) state administration under Menteri Besar Wan Rosdy Wan Ismail since May 2018 and Member of the Pahang State Legislative Assembly (MLA) for Bebar since May 2013. He is a member of the United Malays National Organisation (UMNO), a component party of the BN coalition.

Election Results

Honours

Honours of Malaysia
  :
  Member of the Order of the Defender of the Realm (AMN) (2011)
  :
  Knight Companion of the Order of the Crown of Pahang (DIMP) - Dato' (2015)
  Knight Companion of the Order of Sultan Ahmad Shah of Pahang (DSAP) - Dato'

Notes

References

Living people
People from Pahang
Malaysian people of Malay descent
Malaysian Muslims
United Malays National Organisation politicians
Members of the Pahang State Legislative Assembly
Pahang state executive councillors
21st-century Malaysian politicians
Year of birth missing (living people)